Drake is an Old English surname of Latin origin.

Notable people with the surname "Drake" include

A
Abraham Drake (1715–1781), American military officer
Alexander Drake (disambiguation), multiple people
Alfred Drake (1914–1992), American actor
Alfred George Drake (1894–1915), British soldier
Alicia Drake (born 1968), British journalist
Alison Drake (diver) (born 1952), English diver
Alonzo Drake (1884–1919), English footballer
Andi Drake (born 1965), English athlete
Andy Drake (1907–??), American baseball player
Anthony Drake (1941–2022), English teacher
Arnold Drake (1924–2007), American writer

B
Barbara Drake (1876–1963), English trade unionist
Benjamin Drake (1794–1841), American historian
Bernard Drake (1537–1586), English admiral
Betsy Drake (1923–2015), American actress
Beverley Drake (born 1956), Guyanese pilot
Bill Drake (disambiguation), multiple people
Billy Drake (1917–2011), British pilot
Bob Drake (disambiguation), multiple people
Brad Drake (born 1975), American politician
Bruce Drake (1905–1983), American basketball coach
Bryan Drake (1925–2001), New Zealand baritone

C
Carl John Drake (1885–1965), American zoologist
Carolyn Drake (born 1971), American photographer
Celeste Drake, American trade unionist
Charles Drake (disambiguation), multiple people
Charlie Drake (1925–2006), British actor
Chris Drake (disambiguation), multiple people
Christopher Drake, American film composer
Clare Drake (1928–2018), Canadian ice hockey coach
Claudia Drake (1918–1997), American actress
Clifford B. Drake (1918–1994), American general
Cyril Drake (1922–1992), English cricketer

D
Dallas Drake (born 1969), Canadian ice hockey player
Daniel Drake (1785–1852), American physician
Danny Drake (born 1995), New Zealand rugby union footballer
Darryl Drake (1956–2019), American football player and coach
Dave Drake (1918–1995), American football coach
David Drake (disambiguation), multiple people
Dawsonne Drake (1724–1784), British politician
D. C. Drake (born 1957), American addictions counselor
Debbie Drake, American fitness specialist
Delos Drake (1886–1965), American baseball player
Diane Drake, American screenwriter
Dickie Drake (born 1946), American politician
Dona Drake (1914–1989), American actress
Dora Drake (born 1992/1993), American politician
Dorcas Drake (1916–1993), American judge
Dusty Drake (born 1964), American musician

E
Edward Drake (disambiguation), multiple people
Edwin Drake (1819–1880), American oil driller
Eli Drake (born 1982), American professional wrestler 
Elias Franklin Drake (1813–1892), American businessman and politician
Elizabeth Drake, Australian composer
Elvin C. Drake (1903–1988), American track coach
Emilio Drake (1855–1915), Spanish politician
Eric Drake (1910–1996), British businessman
Ervin Drake (1919–2015), American songwriter

F
Fabia Drake (1904–1990), English actress
Frances Ann Denny Drake (1797–1875), American actress
Francis Drake (disambiguation), multiple people
Frank Drake (1930–2022), American astrophysicist
Franklin J. Drake (1846–1929), American admiral
Fred Drake (1958–2002), American musician
Friedrich Drake (1805–1882), German sculptor

G
Gabrielle Drake (born 1944), British actress
Gayla Drake (born 1964), American singer-songwriter
Geoffrey Drake (1911–1995), English art director
Grace L. Drake (1926–2020), American politician
Grae Drake (born 1980), American journalist
Greg Drake (born 1969), Australian rugby league footballer
Guy Drake (1904–1984), American singer

H
Hamid Drake (born 1955), American percussionist
Hannah Drake, American poet
Harold A. Drake (born 1942), American scholar
Harry Drake (1915–1997), American archer
Heinrich Drake (1881–1970), German politician
Howard Drake (born 1956), British diplomat

J
Jack Drake (disambiguation), multiple people
James Drake (disambiguation), multiple people
Jay Drake (born 1969), American auto racing driver
Jeannie Drake (born 1948), British politician
Jeremey Drake (born 1968), South African cricketer
Jerry Drake (American football) (born 1969), American football player
Jessica Drake (born 1974), American actress
Jim Drake (disambiguation), multiple people
Jimmy Drake (1912–1968), American humorist
John Drake (disambiguation), multiple people
Johnny Drake (1916–1973), American football player
Joseph Drake (disambiguation), multiple people
Josh Drake (born 1979), American musicologist
Judith Drake (1670–1723), English author
Julius Drake (born 1959), English pianist

K
Ken Drake (disambiguation), multiple people
Kenyan Drake (born 1994), American football player
Kevin Drake (born 1979), American musician

L
Larry Drake (1949–2016), American actor
Larry Drake (baseball) (1921–1985), American baseball player
Leah Bodine Drake (1904–1964), American poet
Leonard Drake (1954–2010), American basketball coach
Leta Powell Drake (1938–2021), American broadcaster
Lindsay Drake (1949–2016), Australian rugby league footballer
Logan Drake (1899–1940), American baseball player
Lyman Drake (1852–1932), American baseball player
Lynwood Drake (1949–1992), American murderer

M
Marcus M. Drake (1835–1907), American politician
Margot Drake (1899–1948), English actress
Marie Drake (1888–1963), American academic administrator
Marino Drake (born 1967), Cuban high jumper
Mary Jane Holmes Shipley Drake (1841–1925), American slave
Maureen Drake (born 1971), Canadian tennis player
Maurice Drake (1923–2014), British judge
Max Drake (born 1952), American musician
Michael Drake (disambiguation), multiple people
Milton Drake (1912–2006), American lyricist
Mo Drake (1928–2021), British advertising executive
Molly Drake (1915–1993), English poet and musician
Monica Drake (born 1967), American writer
Montague Garrard Drake (1692–1728), English politician

N
Nadia Drake, American journalist
Naomi Drake (1907–1987), American registrar
Nathan Drake (disambiguation), multiple people
Newman E. Drake (1860–1930), American entrepreneur
Ngaire Drake (born 1949), New Zealand runner
Nick Drake (disambiguation), multiple people
Norman Drake (1912–1972), British athlete

O
OL Drake (born 1984), English guitarist
Oliver Drake (disambiguation), multiple people
Owen Drake (1936–2011), American politician

P
Patricia Drake (born 1957), Canadian actress
Paul Drake (disambiguation), multiple people
Peggy Drake (1922–2014), Austrian-American actress
Penny Drake (born 1984), American actress
Pete Drake (1932–1988), American record producer
Piper J. Drake (born 1976), Thai-American author
Priscilla Holmes Drake (1812–1892), American suffragist

R
Rae Drake (1926–2013), American football player
Ray Drake (1934–2013), English footballer
Reinaldo Drake (born 1923), Cuban baseball player
Rhiannon Drake (born 1989), British musician
Richard Drake (1535–1603), English stable master
Richard F. Drake (1927–2008), American politician
Rob Drake (born 1969), American umpire
Robert Drake (disambiguation), multiple people
Roger Drake (disambiguation), multiple people
Ron Drake (born 1937), American politician

S
Sammy Drake (1934–2010), American baseball player
Samuel Drake (disambiguation), multiple people
Sarah Drake (1803–1857), English illustrator
Shane Drake, American music video director
Simon Drake (born 1957), English musician
Simon Drake (writer) (born 1975), Australian writer
Sofia Drake (1662–1741), Swedish landowner
Solly Drake (1930–2021), American baseball player
Stan Drake (1921–1997), American cartoonist
St. Clair Drake (1911–1990), American sociologist
Stephanie Drake, American actress
Steve Drake (born 1954), American actor
Stillman Drake (1910–1993), Canadian historian
Susannah Drake (born 1965), American architect
Sylvia Drake (1784–1868), American tailor

T
Tasman Drake (1884–1946), New Zealand clergyman and cricketer
Ted Drake (1912–1995), British cricketer
Tharon Drake (born 1992), American swimmer
Thelma Drake (born 1949), American politician
Theodore Drake (1891–1959), Canadian pediatrician
Theodore W. Drake (1907–2000), American cartoonist
Thomas Drake (disambiguation), multiple people
Tom Drake (disambiguation), multiple people
Tony Drake (disambiguation), multiple people
Tracy Drake (1864–1939), American hotelier
Troy Drake (born 1972), American football player

V
Vern Drake (born 1946), Australian footballer

W
Walter Drake (1879–1941), New Zealand rugby union footballer
Wiley Drake (born 1943), American minister
William Drake (disambiguation), multiple people

Y
Yadir Drake (born 1990), Cuban baseball player

Z
Zak Drake (born 1991), Canadian footballer

Fictional characters
Adam Drake, ex-counterespionage agent and mystery solving attorney on The Edge of Night
Alex Drake (Pretty Little Liars), a character on the television series Pretty Little Liars.
Alex Drake (Ashes to Ashes), in the TV series Ashes to Ashes
Charlie Drake, a character in the  1985 American science fantasy movie Explorers
Charlotte Drake, a character on the television series Pretty Little Liars
Bobby Drake (Iceman (comics), a Marvel Comics superhero and member of the X-Men, the Champions (1975 team), and the Defenders
Dèmon Drake, in the TV series Charmed
Dinah Drake (Black Canary) of DC Comics
Doofus Drake, in the animated series DuckTales
Downy O'Drake, a Disney character
Evan Drake, a character in the TV sitcom Cheers
John Drake (Danger Man), in the TV series Danger Man
Ludwig Von Drake, a character on the cartoon The Wonderful World of Color
Mark Drake, a Colonial Marine smart gunner in the film Aliens
Mary Drake, a character on the television series Pretty Little Liars
Mons Drake, in Tensou Sentai Goseiger
Nathan Drake, the main character of the video game series Uncharted
Noah Drake, a character on the soap opera General Hospital
Patrick Drake, a character on the soap opera General Hospital
Paul Drake (character), a private detective in various media of the Perry Mason franchise
Robert Putney Drake, in the Illuminatus! Trilogy of books
Temple Drake, a character in novels written by William Faulkner
Tim Drake, a character in the comic series DC Comics
 Will Drake, in American Horror Story: Hotel

See also
Drake (disambiguation), a disambiguation page for "Drake"
Drake (given name), a page for people with the given name "Drake"
Admiral Drake (disambiguation), a disambiguation page for Admirals surnamed "Drake"
General Drake (disambiguation), a disambiguation page for Generals surnamed "Drake"
Governor Drake (disambiguation), a disambiguation page for Governors surnamed "Drake"
Senator Drake (disambiguation), a disambiguation page for Senators surnamed "Drake"

References

English-language surnames
Surnames of Old English origin
Surnames of English origin